Tulus Widodo Kalimanto (born 23 August 1965) is an Indonesian former cyclist. He competed in the men's sprint at the 1992 Summer Olympics.

References

1965 births
Living people
Indonesian male cyclists
Olympic cyclists of Indonesia
Cyclists at the 1992 Summer Olympics
Place of birth missing (living people)